China Dongxiang (Group) Company Limited is a Chinese company listed on the main board of the Stock Exchange of Hong Kong. It is engaged in the design and sales of sports apparel and footwear in Asia. It owns all the rights to Kappa products in China, while Phenix products are marketed in Japan.

History
In April 2008, China Dongxiang announced the acquisition of Phenix Co., Ltd. ("Phenix"), which mainly owned and managed Kappa and Phenix brands in Japan. As a result, the group expanded its regional brand portfolio extending product types to help develop the China ski and outdoor fashion markets.

Mission
The company aims to further enhance its current R&D techniques and ability to integrate Japan Phenix's strong design and R&D capacity as well as relevant talents.

References

External links
Official Website
Stockx Sneakers
Canvas Sports Shoes

Chinese brands
Shoe companies of China
Companies based in Beijing
Privately held companies of China
Sporting goods manufacturers of China
Chinese companies established in 2007
Companies listed on the Hong Kong Stock Exchange